Celtic Empire is the twenty-fifth novel in the Dirk Pitt Adventures novel series by Clive Cussler, and the last written by the original author.

Plot
NUMA Director Dirk Pitt, as well as NUMA itself, becomes involved in finding who is behind a plot to murder a team of scientists in El Salvador, rob a team of archaeologists along the Nile and who is behind a deadly collision in the waterways along the city of Detroit. Before the mystery can be solved, Pitt's two children become targets of killers. Pitt's detective work on the mystery leads him to Scotland; where he, with the help of NUMA, must stop a deadly plot that could radically change the world.

Reviews
Kirkus Reviews liked this novel, saying in its review, "One darned thing after another keeps the Pitts in peril and will keep readers turning the pages." The New York Journal of Books provided another favorable review, saying, "From the jungles of Central America to the croc-infested waters of the Nile and across the sea to the home of the ancient Celts, Dirk Pitt and company embark on a thrilling adventure that’s difficult to put down." Book Reporter also liked this novel.

Celtic Empire was third on the New York Times "Combined Print & E-Book Fiction" list for the week of April 7, 2019. That is the highest point it reached on that list.

References

2019 American novels
Novels by Clive Cussler
Dirk Pitt novels
Collaborative novels
G. P. Putnam's Sons books